Chad Samuel Joseph Yates (born 17 September 1988) is an English former first-class cricketer.

Yates was born at Leicester in September 1988. While studying at Anglia Ruskin University, he made two appearances in first-class cricket for Cambridge MCCU in 2014, against Surrey and Essex at Fenner's. In addition to playing first-class cricket, Yates also played minor counties cricket for Bedfordshire in 2010, making a single appearance in the MCCA Knockout Trophy.

References

External links

1988 births
Living people
People from Leicester
Alumni of Anglia Ruskin University
English cricketers
Bedfordshire cricketers
Cambridge MCCU cricketers